The Recording of Mr Beast is a 2006 film starring Scottish post-rock band Mogwai. The film is also known as A Film I Was Pure In.

Overview
The Recording of Mr Beast is a 40-minute documentary about the recording of Mogwai's fifth album, Mr Beast, at Castle of Doom Studios in Glasgow, Scotland, spliced in with footage from a Mogwai gig at ABC Glasgow on 18 August 2005, and Question and Answer footage featuring the band cynically answering questions about themselves and the album. The documentary was filmed in one week near the end of the recording of the album, and features footage of Mogwai recording "We're No Here" and "Glasgow Mega-Snake". A promo EPK of Mr Beast included a 13-minute version of the documentary.

Mogwai
Documentary films about rock music and musicians
2006 films
2006 documentary films
2000s English-language films